Peggy Frair (born July 26, 1950) is an American luger. She competed in the women's singles event at the 1972 Winter Olympics.

References

External links
 

1950 births
Living people
American female lugers
Olympic lugers of the United States
Lugers at the 1972 Winter Olympics
Sportspeople from New York City
21st-century American women